The Haslachmühle is a landmarked historic flour mill in Salzburgs urban district and former mill village Gnigl.

The building was first documented in 1577 as "kleine Müllel im Haslach". Today's building was constructed in 1688 und was expanded during the last centuries. The mill is also known as Flocknermuhle (Flöcknermühle) and is private property of the family with the same name since the mid of the 19th century. It was powered by an overshot water wheel.

In 2014 a bed and breakfast was opened in the main building named "Romantic Pension Haslachmuhle".

Chapel Maria Luggau

In 1689 during the construction of a new house a momentous accident happened. A scaffolding broke and seven workers fell into the ditch but as by a wonder nobody was hurt. As a result the religious miller family constructed a small chapel in honor of Mary (mother of Jesus).

The workers came from Carinthia or Lienz District, where a picture of the Blessed Virgin Mary was adored by the people since 1513. A copy of this picture is in the center of the altar and gave the name to the chapel. Despite the plain architecture there are some fine artworks within the building. The chapel is situated along the famous pilgrim's way to St. Wolfgang at the Wolfgangsee.

References

External links

B&B Haslachmuhle – official website 
http://www.tripadvisor.com/Hotel_Review-g190441-d6674835-Reviews-Die_Haslachmuhle-Salzburg_Austrian_Alps.html

Buildings and structures in Salzburg
Watermills in Austria
Economy of Salzburg (state)